All or Nothing is the second collaborative album by drum and bass artists Calyx and Teebee. The album was released on November 5, 2012.

Track listing

References

2012 albums
Collaborative albums
Drum and bass albums
RAM Records albums